Chionodes acrina is a moth in the family Gelechiidae. It is found in North America, where it has been recorded from Washington to California.

The larvae feed on Quercus agrifolia.

References

Chionodes
Moths described in 1933
Moths of North America